In mathematics, a vector bundle is said to be flat if it is endowed with a linear connection with vanishing curvature, i.e. a flat connection.

de Rham cohomology of a flat vector bundle
Let  denote a flat vector bundle, and  be the covariant derivative associated to the flat connection on E.

In other words, the graded vector space  is a cochain complex. Its cohomology is called the de Rham cohomology of E, or de Rham cohomology with coefficients twisted by the local coefficient system E.

Flat trivializations
A trivialization of a flat vector bundle is said to be flat if the connection form vanishes in this trivialization. An equivalent definition of a flat bundle is the choice of a trivializing atlas with locally constant transition maps.

Examples
 Trivial line bundles can have several flat bundle structures. The parallel vector fields are constant in the first case, and proportional to local determinations of the square root in the second.
 The real canonical line bundle  of a differential manifold M is a flat line bundle, called the orientation bundle. Its sections are volume forms.
 A Riemannian manifold is flat if and only if its Levi-Civita connection gives its tangent vector bundle a flat structure.

See also
 Vector-valued differential forms
 Local system, the more general notion of a locally constant sheaf.
 Orientation character, a characteristic form related to the orientation line bundle, useful to formulate Twisted Poincaré duality
 Picard group whose connected component, the Jacobian variety, is the moduli space of algebraic flat line bundles.
 Monodromy, or representations of the fundamental group by parallel transport on flat bundles.
 Holonomy, the obstruction to flatness.

Vector bundles